Colin Muller (born December 1, 1963) is a Canadian-born Swiss professional ice hockey coach and former professional ice hockey player. He is currently serving as the head coach of the Swiss women's national team.

Playing career 
Muller spent most of his playing career at EV Zug. In 1986–87, his first year at EVZ, he contributed to the team earning promotion to the Swiss top-flight National League A (NLA). Muller would win the Swiss championship with Zug in 1998 and moved to HC Fribourg-Gottéron in 1999 before calling it a career in 2000. He played a total of 544 NLA contests, scoring 203 goals.

Coaching career 
Muller formed a coaching duo with Hans Kossmann at HC Fribourg-Gottéron at the beginning of his career behind the bench.

He then joined the coaching staff of SC Rapperswil-Jona for the 2000-01 campaign and accepted another head coaching position in 2002, again signing with HC Fribourg-Gottéron. He was relieved of his duties in January 2003.

From 2003 to 2008, Muller served as assistant coach at EV Zug, before he signed with the ZSC Lions, also as an assistant. At both clubs, he worked under Sean Simpson. At ZSC, he was promoted to head coach in 2010, replacing Simpson, who took over the Swiss national team. However, Muller's head coaching tenure with the Lions lasted only 16 games, in which the Lions collected 20 points. He was dismissed in October 2010.

Muller was named head coach of NLB side EHC Olten prior to the 2011-12 campaign. After four straight defeats and following a 2–8 loss to rivals SC Langenthal, he was sacked in December 2011. After serving as assistant coach of the Swiss national team during the 2011 World Championship, Muller was handed further responsibilities by the Swiss ice hockey federation: He coached the under-20 squad, while continuing as assistant of the men's team, again working under Sean Simpson during the 2013 (silver medal) and 2014 World Championships as well as at the 2014 Winter Olympics.

He also served as Simpson's assistant during the short stint at Lokomotiv Yaroslavl of the Kontinental Hockey League in the 2014–15 and was named assistant coach of the Kloten Flyers, when Simpson became head coach of the club in December 2014. After the club had announced budget cuts and was taken over by a new owner, Muller's contract was terminated by mutual consent in May 2016. Later that month, he was named assistant coach of Adler Mannheim of the Deutsche Eishockey Liga (DEL) in Germany, again serving under Sean Simpson. Muller, Simpson and general manager Teal Fowler were sacked on December 4, 2017, due to the team's underwhelming start to the season.

In early February 2019, he was named assistant coach of the Swiss women's national team. In July 2019, he became the head coach, replacing Daniela Diaz.

References

External links

Living people
1963 births
EHC Basel players
EV Zug players
HC Fribourg-Gottéron players
Ice hockey people from Toronto
Swiss ice hockey coaches
Swiss ice hockey left wingers